Artemonopsis is a genus of air-breathing land snails, terrestrial pulmonate gastropod mollusks in the family Streptaxidae.

Distribution 
The distribution of the genus Artemonopsis includes:
 Ivory Coast

Description 
The internal anatomy of this genus is not known.

Species
Species within the genus Artemonopsis include:
 Artemonopsis chevalieri (Germain, 1908)

References

 Germain, L., 1908. - Contribution à la faune malacologique de l'Afrique équatoriale. XIV Mollusques nouveaux de la Côte d'Ivoire (Mission A. Chevalier 19061907). Bulletin du Muséum national d'Histoire naturelle 14(2): 124-127
 Germain, L., 1908. - Mollusques terrestres et fluviatiles recueillis par M.A. Chevalier à la Côte d'Ivoire. Journal de Conchyliologie 56: 95-115, 1 pl
 Bank, R. A. (2017). Classification of the Recent terrestrial Gastropoda of the World. Last update: July 16, 2017

Endemic fauna of Ivory Coast
Streptaxidae